The Norwegian Federation of Craft Enterprises is an employers' organisation in Norway, organized under the national Confederation of Norwegian Enterprise.

It was established in 1993 under the name Håndverksbedriftenes Landsforening (HBL).

The current director is Merethe Sunde. Chairman of the board is Vibeke Giske.

References

External links
Official site

Employers' organisations in Norway
1993 establishments in Norway